B-Sides and Rarities is a compilation album by American dream pop band Beach House, released on June 30, 2017 through Sub Pop in North America, Bella Union in Europe, and Mistletone Records in Australia. The compilation contains B-sides and rare, unreleased cuts along with two new songs, "Chariot" and "Baseball Diamond". It also includes the band's cover of Queen's "Play the Game".

Background and development

The idea for a B-sides record came when the band realized how many non-album songs had been made over the years, and how hard it was to find and hear many of them. This compilation contains every song the band has ever made that does not exist on one of their records. The oldest song is "Rain in Numbers" which was recorded in 2005 during the summer when the band was formed. "We didn't have a piano, so we asked our friend if we could use his, which was pretty out of tune. We used the mic that was on the four-track machine to record the piano and vocals. It was originally the secret song on our self-titled debut." The next couple of songs are from late 2008. The band said they were "so excited" about "Used to Be" that they recorded it right after writing it so they could have it as a 7" single for their fall tour with the Baltimore Round Robin. They recorded their cover of Queen's "Play the Game" in the same session. It was for a charity compilation benefiting AIDS research, stating that they "will continue to donate all profits from the song to that charity. As fans of Queen, we thought it would be fun and ridiculous to try to adapt their high-powered pop song into our realm. These songs were recorded at the same studio where we made Devotion."

"Baby" was written and recorded in October 2009 with the band's friend Jason Quever. "10 Mile Stereo" was recorded during the Teen Dream session in July 2009, "since we used tape, we often slowed the tape way down to create effects while recording. When we were doing that for "10 Mile Stereo" we decided we wanted to make an alternate version where the whole song was slowed down, hence the “10 Mile Stereo (Cough Syrup Remix)"". "White Moon" and "The Arrangement" were both songs that the band didn't believe fit on Teen Dream. The former originally appeared on the band's live iTunes Session EP. Since the song was recorded and mixed "very hastily", they have remixed it to better match their "current aesthetics". They have also remixed and included the version of "Norway" they did at that same session, noting: "the main reason we wanted to include "Norway" is that it features a very different bridge from the original version."

"I Do Not Care for the Winter Sun" was written and recorded in 2010 during a break between tours after Beach House felt "incredibly grateful" to their fans, and was released for free on the internet, unmastered. They stated that the song was now mastered for the album. "Wherever You Go" is another song from that era. The band said they "always loved" it, but thought it sounded too much like their old music. They paused writing it and didn't finish it until 2011 during the Bloom recording session, where it appeared as a hidden track on Bloom. "Equal Mind" was also recorded during the Bloom session. They said they "really like this song", but pulled it from the record when they realized it had "the exact same tempo" as "Other People". The Bloom sessions led to "Saturn Song". This song is built on a piano loop the band wrote while recording Bloom. It also contains sounds recorded in deep space. It originally appeared on a compilation of songs incorporating space sounds which was released in 2014.

Content
The compilation contains 14 tracks—twelve of which were previously released, but were "in general, hard to find good versions of." "Chariot" is one of the two new, previously unreleased songs on the album, the other being "Baseball Diamond". Both tracks were recorded during the sessions for the band's 2015 albums Depression Cherry and Thank Your Lucky Stars. "Baby", "The Arrangement" and "10 Mile Stereo" (Cough Syrup remix) were released as B-sides to the band's 2010 single "Zebra", with the first also being included as a B-side for "Norway" and as an iTunes bonus track for the single's parent album, Teen Dream. "Equal Mind" was released as a B-side to "Lazuli", the second single from the band's 2012 album, Bloom. The single version of "Used to Be" was released in 2008. It was later reworked into the version that appears on Teen Dream. "White Moon" is a song released on the band's iTunes Session EP, which also included a version of "Norway". A remix of the two versions appears on the album. "Play the Game" is a Queen cover, which the band had recorded in 2009. It appeared on the compilation album by various artists Dark Was the Night. "Saturn Song" was released on 2014 as the band's contribution to The Space Project, another compilation album by various artists, released through Lefse Records. "Rain in Numbers" and "Wherever You Go" are hidden tracks that appeared at the end of the closing tracks of Beach House and Bloom respectively. "I Do Not Care for the Winter Sun" is a holiday song the band released in 2010.

Beach House stated that a few of the songs on the album were remastered, with some being brought "up to date".

Release
The album was released on June 30, 2017 through Sub Pop worldwide, Bella Union in the UK, and Mistletone in Australia, on CD, LP, cassette and digital download. It was made available for pre-order on May 17, 2017, and was accompanied by the release of "Chariot", which was uploaded to the band's official YouTube channel a day later. On June 14, they released a music video for the song.

Critical reception

At Metacritic, which assigns a normalized rating out of 100 to reviews from critics, the album received an average score of 75, based on 9 reviews, indicating "generally favorable reviews". AllMusic said "B-Sides and Rarities points out the similarities and differences in Beach House's music over the years, even if its tracks aren't in chronological order," adding that it is "a collection that's lovely in its own right, and in its own way, is just as representative of Beach House's music as a traditional best-of would be." Daily Express called it the best album of the week, while stating that the songs "paint a fascinating picture of a band slowly building from the delicacy of earlier tracks." Drowned in Sound stated that "what the record lacks in atmosphere, it more than makes up for in discrete bursts of quality." Pretty Much Amazing stated that Beach House "might be clearing the deck before a major label deal, or a shift in sound, or a next step in the band, but I have yet to hear a weak Beach House song, here's to hoping for seven more."

Paste said "B-Sides and Rarities is a career-spanning collection, but Beach House’s sound has remained so consistent that, without the band’s extensive notes, it’s nearly impossible to guess which songs stem from which era," further stating that: "There is nothing remotely bad on here, but there is also nothing that finds the duo lightening up or straying too far from the warm glow of their trademark sound. Nothing outlandish or self-indulgent or uncharacteristically loud." Under the Radar wrote: "this is the archetypical B-sides and rarities album. Thankfully, Beach House's B-sides are equivalent to most bands' A-sides, yet we are still left with a mixed bag," concluding that "ultimately, this B-sides and rarities album includes some intriguing material that will keep fans entertained until the next album, but most likely will have them returning to their favorite album tracks for a more satisfying fix." Pitchfork wrote: "It's a testament to the band's consistency that B-Sides and Rarities plays nearly as smoothly as a proper Beach House album, even though one of these tracks—scattered non-chronologically through an hourlong playtime—is more than a decade old."

Track listing
All songs written by Victoria Legrand and Alex Scally, except where noted.

"Chariot" – 5:16
Previously unreleased song from the Depression Cherry and Thank Your Lucky Stars sessions (2015)
"Baby" – 3:02
B-side to "Zebra" (2010)
"Equal Mind" – 3:43
B-side to "Lazuli" (2012)
"Used to Be" (2008 Single Version) – 4:06
Single version of the song from Teen Dream (2010)
"White Moon" (iTunes Session Remix) – 4:07
Live recording from iTunes Session EP (2010)
"Baseball Diamond" – 4:36
Previously unreleased song from the Depression Cherry and Thank Your Lucky Stars sessions (2015)
"Norway" (iTunes Session Remix) – 3:16
Live version from iTunes Session EP of song from Teen Dream (2010)
"Play the Game" (Freddie Mercury) – 4:18
From Dark Was the Night (2009)
"The Arrangement" – 5:05
B-side to "Zebra" (2010)
"Saturn Song" – 4:31
From The Space Project (2014)
"Rain in Numbers" – 2:27
Hidden track from Beach House (2006)
"I Do Not Care for the Winter Sun" – 3:11
Non-album single from 2010
"10 Mile Stereo" (Cough Syrup Remix) – 5:31
Alternate version of the song from Teen Dream (2010), released as a b-side to "Zebra"
"Wherever You Go" – 3:27
Hidden track from Bloom (2012)

Personnel
Credits adapted from the album's liner notes.

Beach House – all instrumentation 
 Victoria Legrand
 Alex Scally

Additional musicians
 Daniel Franz – live drums , live percussion 
 James Barone – live drums 
 Jason Quever – live drums 
 Graham Hill – live drums 

Artwork
 Beach House – art direction
 Jeff Kleinsmith – art direction, design

Production
 Beach House – production , mixing 
 Chris Coady – production , engineering , mixing , remixing 
 Rob Girardi – production , engineering , mixing 
 Jason Quever – production, engineering, mixing 
 Steven Wright – engineering 
 Brian Thorn – engineering 
 David Tolomei – engineering 
 Manuel Calderon – engineering 
 Jay Wesley – engineering assistance 
 Heba Kadry – mastering 
 Joe LaPorta – mastering

Charts

References

2017 compilation albums
Beach House albums
Sub Pop compilation albums
B-side compilation albums